The National Highways and Infrastructure Development Corporation Limited (NHIDCL) is a fully owned company of the Government of India, set up in 2014 and is responsible for management of a network of over 5,500 km of National Highways out of 1,15,000 km in India. It is a nodal agency of the Ministry of Road Transport and Highways. Chanchal Kumar (IAS) is the present Managing Director of NHIDCL since 31 January 2022.

History
Highways Connectivity Company Ltd. was set up under Companies Act, 2013. The name of the company was subsequently changed to National Highways and Infrastructure Development Corporation Ltd. and started functioning w.e.f. 18 July 2014. It was created to develop, maintain and manage the national highways, strategic roads and other infrastructure of India. It was dedicated to the task of promoting regional connectivity in parts of the country which share international boundaries. It is responsible  for the development, maintenance and management of National Highways in hilly terrain of North-East part of India, Andaman & Nicobar Islands, Himachal Pradesh, Jammu & Kashmir, Ladakh and Uttarakhand. It works as a specialised agency in high altitude areas and border areas. Apart from highways, NHIDCL is constructing logistic hubs and transport related infrastructures e.g. multimodal transport hubs such as bus ports, container depots, automated multilevel car parking etc. Sh. Anand Kumar (IAS) was the first Managing Director of NHIDCL in 2014.

Composition
 Secretary (RT&H) is the ex-officio Chairman of the company. The Board of Directors consists of one Managing Director, Additional Director General is the ex-officio Director (Tech.), one Director (Finance/Administration), three independent part-time Directors and five Executive Directors (Tech.) to oversee timely completion of the projects. 
 NHIDCL has 14 Regional Offices (ROs), 47 Project Monitoring Units (PMUs) and about 83 Site Offices (SOs) in 14 States/UTs. Regional Offices are headed by Executive Directors, PMUs are headed by General Managers, and Site Offices are headed by Dy. General Manager/Managers.
 Below Manager level are Engineers who are predominantly responsible for carrying out tasks such as designing, planning, and supervising the construction of highways and other infrastructure projects, ensuring compliance with safety and quality standards, and resolving technical issues related to construction. They work closely with contractors, consultants, and other stakeholders to resolve any issues related to the design, construction, or maintenance of the projects and also ensure that the project is completed within the budget and the given timeline.

Projects

The NHIDCL (along with BRO) has the task to implement the Special Accelerated Road Development Programme for North Eastern Region (SARDP-NE) in National Highways portion. The SARDP-NE is under implementation in Phases.

 Phase-A: Approved in 2005, it included about 4,099 km length of roads (3,014 km of NH and 1,085 km of State roads). The SARDP-NE Phase ‘A’ is expected to be completed by 2023-24.
 Phase-B: It covers 3,723 km (2,210 km NHs and 1,513 km of State roads) of road. Phase ‘B’ of SARDP-NE shall be taken up after completion of Phase ‘A’.

Notable Road Projects

 Tripura Connectivity Project: NHIDCL has undertaken several road and bridge projects in Tripura to improve connectivity with neighboring states and promote trade and commerce. The project includes the construction of the 6.5-km-long Mahadevpur-Titamura bridge, which is the longest bridge in Tripura.
 Imphal-Moreh Road Project: NHIDCL is responsible for the construction of the 65-km-long Imphal-Moreh road project in Manipur. The road will improve connectivity between India and Myanmar and promote cross-border trade.
 Tawang Road Project: NHIDCL is responsible for the construction of the Tawang road project in Arunachal Pradesh. The road will provide all-weather connectivity to the Tawang district, which is located close to the India-China border.
 Kailash Mansarovar Road Project: NHIDCL is responsible for the construction of the Kailash Mansarovar road project in Uttarakhand. The road will improve connectivity between India and China, and provide a shorter route for the Kailash Mansarovar Yatra.
 SASEC Road Connectivity Project: NHIDCL is implementing the South Asia Subregional Economic Cooperation (SASEC) Road Connectivity Project, which involves the upgradation of around 500 km of roads in the North-Eastern region. The project aims to improve connectivity and promote trade and commerce in the region.

Tunnels
NHIDCL has been constructing tunnels in challenging conditions since its inception. Some of the big tunnel projects are as under:
 Zoji-la Tunnel: It will be the India's longest road tunnel.
 Z-Morh Tunnel
 Shinkun La Tunnel
 Silkyara Tunnel

NHIDCL has also set up a Center of Excellence for Tunnel Studies (CETS).

Bridges
NHIDCL has been constructing some of the prestigious bridges in challenging conditions since its inception. Some of the notable projects are as under:
 Dhubri-Phulbari bridge:
This bridge is being constructed across river Brahmaputra on Assam-Meghalaya border. Once complete, it will be the longest bridge in India leaving behind current longest Dhola-Sadiya bridge.

Infrastructure Projects
Apart from highway projects, NHIDCL has been constructing some mega infrastructure projects also. Some of the notable projects are as under:
 Multi Modal Logistic Parks:
One such MMLP is being constructed at Jogighopa in the state of Assam. It will have a railway siding, jetty, warehouses, business centres at one place to facilitate freight logistics.
 Automated Multi Level Car Parking:
One such A-MLCP has been constructed at Transport Bhawan, New Delhi. It is aimed to address parking problem in congested cities.

International presence
NHIDCL is providing its services of highway and bridge construction in Nepal.

Initiatives
Apart from maintaining national highways, NHIDCL has developed internet portals for smooth governance. These include followings:
 INAM Pro+: It is a web platform for Infrastructure and Materials Providers. The Portal was formally launched on 10 March 2015.
 INFRACON: It has been developed as a comprehensive National Portal for Infrastructure Consultancy firms & Key Personnel in order to make the evaluation process during procurement more objective, user friendly and transparent.
 ePACE: It is an online tool to monitor and improve the progress of works at the click of a button.

See also
 List of National Highways in India
 National Highways Authority of India
 Expressways of India
 State Highways(SH)
 Inland Waterways Authority of India
 Transport in India

References

External links
 National Highways and Infrastructre Development Corporation
 Ministry of Road Transport and Highways

Roads in India
Road authorities
Ministry of Road Transport and Highways
Authority
Government agencies established in 2014
2014 establishments in Delhi
Organisations based in Delhi